$pent is a 2000 drama film directed by Gil Cates Jr. and starring Jason London, Charlie Spradling, and Gil Cates Jr.

Premise

An unemployed actor uses his skills to con everyone he knows into lending or giving him money to pay off his debts.

Cast
Jason London as Max
Charlie Spradling as Brigette
Phill Lewis as Doug
Erin Beaux as Nathan
James Parks as Grant
Richmond Arquette as Jay
Barbara Barrie as Mrs. Walsh
Gilbert Cates as Mr. Walsh
Rain Phoenix as Kimberly
Kaela Dobkin as Jessica

Reception
The film received generally unfavorable reviews on Metacritic.com, getting 34/100 based on 8 critics.

External links

References

2000 films
2000 drama films
American drama films
Films directed by Gil Cates Jr.
2000s English-language films
2000s American films